
Nakło County is a unit of territorial administration and local government (powiat) in Kuyavian-Pomeranian Voivodeship, north-central Poland. It came into being on January 1, 1999, as a result of the Polish local government reforms passed in 1998.

As of 2006 its total population is 84,786, out of which the population of Nakło nad Notecią is 18,281, that of Szubin is 9,556, that of Kcynia is 4,657, that of Mrocza is 4,350, and the rural population is 49,605.

Neighbouring counties
Nakło County is bordered by Sępólno County to the north, Bydgoszcz County to the east, Żnin County to the south, Wągrowiec County to the southwest and Piła County to the west.

Administrative division
The county is subdivided into five gminas (four urban-rural and one rural). These are listed in the following table, in descending order of population.

References
   Polish official population figures 2019

 
Land counties of Kuyavian-Pomeranian Voivodeship